Esdras Isaí Padilla Reyes (born 4 September 1989) is a Honduran football player, who most recently played for F.C. Motagua.

Club career
Because of a rule in Honduran football stating that each team must play an under 20 player for a total of 540 minutes, Esdras was able to take a spot and become a regular player for Hispano in 2008.

International career
He was called up to train with the national squad but wasn't in the lineup against any team. Padilla played for Honduras at the 2009 FIFA U-20 World Cup in Egypt.

International goals

Personal life
He has played at Motagua alongside his younger brother, Eleazar Padilla. His other brother, Rigoberto Padilla plays for Victoria.

References

1989 births
Living people
Sportspeople from Tegucigalpa
Association football defenders
Honduran footballers
Honduras international footballers
Hispano players
F.C. Motagua players
Juticalpa F.C. players
C.D. Real de Minas players
Liga Nacional de Fútbol Profesional de Honduras players
2009 CONCACAF U-20 Championship players
20th-century Honduran people
21st-century Honduran people